Written for children, Letters from a Lost Uncle by Mervyn Peake is a combination of pencil drawing and typed manuscript. It is written in the form of letters from a lost uncle who is travelling in distant polar regions in search of a white lion. He has a spike for a leg, and is accompanied by his retainer, Jackson, a bizarre turtle figure.

Originally published in 1948, the book was well-received but Peake complained about the war-time quality of the paper on which it was printed and it was subsequently withdrawn. It was reissued in 1976 and is now published by Methuen.

References

External links
Official Mervyn Peake site

1948 British novels
British children's novels
Books by Mervyn Peake
Eyre & Spottiswoode books
1948 children's books